Randan (also Romanized as Randān, Rendān, and Rindān) is a village in Sulqan Rural District, Kan District, Tehran County, Tehran Province, Iran. At the 2006 census, its population was 223, in 65 families.

References 

Populated places in Tehran County